The 2025 World Athletics Championships will be the twentieth edition of the World Athletics Championships, and are scheduled to be held in 13-21 september 2025 in Tokyo, Japan. The championships will use the National Stadium, rebuilt for the Tokyo 2020 Olympic and Paralympic Games.

This is the third time that the championships will be held in Japan, following the 2007 event in Osaka, and the 1991 event in Tokyo at the old National Stadium.

Host selection 
Nairobi, Kenya (Kasarani Stadium)
Singapore (National Stadium)
Tokyo, Japan (National Stadium)
Chorzów, Poland (Stadion Śląski)

In October 2019, World Athletics President Sebastian Coe stated consideration of a direct choice for Kenya to host this championship. Kenya confirmed its bid for the championships in October 2021. In 2022, Japan and Singapore entered bids to host the championships. In July 2022, Tokyo was selected by World Athletics to host the 2025 event, after it scored the highest in the bid evaluation. The National Stadium in Tokyo will be the first major spectator event for athletics after the 2020 Summer Olympics were held behind closed doors in response with the then-still ongoing COVID-19 pandemic. Coe welcomed the selection, but stated that his "ambition to see a World Championships in Africa .. is undiminished". In same time Chorzow, however, had got European Championships in 2028 as compensation already a year earlier.

References 

2025
World Championships
Scheduled sports events
August 2025 sports events in Asia
Sports competitions in Tokyo
International athletics competitions hosted by Japan
Athletics in Tokyo